Across the Water is the only studio album by rapper Baby Boy da Prince, released on March 20, 2007 by Republic Records. The full album was leaked onto the Internet on March 16. Following its release, it debuted at number 26 on the Billboard 200, selling about 26,000 copies in its first week. As of October 2007, it has sold 163,315 copies in the US and 189,535 copies worldwide.

Track listing
"Intro"
"The Way I Live" (featuring Lil Boosie)
"Naw Meen" (featuring Mannie Fresh)
"Slide in Slide Out"
"Lock Me Down"
"Skit #1"
"Marrero" (featuring Shoeshine & Reality)
"Skit #2"
"Rollin' to Det"
"Monday, Tuesday, Wednesday (The Proposal Song)"
"Rich Boy"
"They Don't Know" (featuring Nina Sky)
"Who Sheed"
"Fist Rock"
"Do What It Do" (featuring Dappa, Marty Bee & Lil' Hidda)
"Skit #3"
"Good Juge"
"Rose"
"Y'all Ready Know" (Bonus Track)

Singles

References

2007 debut albums
Baby Boy da Prince albums
Albums produced by Mannie Fresh
Universal Records albums